Maulty Moore (born August 12, 1946), is a former professional American football defensive tackle who played for five seasons with the Miami Dolphins, the Cincinnati Bengals, and the Tampa Bay Buccaneers. Undrafted on graduating Bethune-Cookman College in 1970, he began a year of conditioning that added 50 pounds to his undersized frame before trying out for the Dolphins as a free agent. He was signed to the Dolphins' taxi squad in 1971, and promoted to special teams the next year. He blocked a Roy Gerela field goal attempt during the Dolphins' 1972 AFC Championship Game victory over the Pittsburgh Steelers. Waived by the Dolphins in 1975, he spent a year with the Bengals before finishing his career in 1976 with the then expansion Tampa Bay Buccaneers. Moore went on to teach in the Broward County school system.

References

1946 births
Living people
People from Okaloosa County, Florida
Players of American football from Florida
American football defensive tackles
Bethune–Cookman Wildcats football players
Miami Dolphins players
Cincinnati Bengals players
Tampa Bay Buccaneers players